Zoran Terzić (born 9 July 1966) is a Serbian volleyball coach. He was the coach of the Serbia women's national volleyball team between 2002 and 2022, and under his leadership the team won 20 European, World and Olympic medals. On club level he coaches Fenerbahçe SK.

As a player, Terzić passed through all selections of the Red Star club in Belgrade between 1979 and 1986. He stopped playing in order to pursue his  studies. He graduated at the University of Belgrade's Faculty of Sport and Physical Education in 1998.

His first experience as a coach was as an assistant to Drago Nešić, head coach of the "IMT" Volleyball Club in Belgrade. In 1996, Terzić began working as a coach of the Red Star's junior team, with whom he won all available titles, from the championships of Belgrade to those of Serbia and FR Yugoslavia. At the suggestion of Aleksandar Boričić, head of the Red Star Volleyball Club, he started helping coach Red Star's women team, although it was not his original plan.

Under Terzić's leadership, Red Star girls interrupted the 8-year winning streak of OK Jedinstvo Užice and won the 2001/02 and 2002/03 seasons of the National League.

Terzić took over the national team of FR Yugoslavia in 2002 (later Serbia and Montenegro and then Serbia), leading his teams to numerous successes, including a bronze medal at the 2006 World Championship, a silver at the 2015 World Cup, the European Championship titles in 2011, 2017 and 2019, and an Olympic silver at Rio 2016.

On 17 January 2022, Terzić announced that he will not coach the national team anymore, as his contract with the National Organization has expired and they mutually agreed not to renew it again.

Club career

References

1966 births
Living people
Serbian volleyball coaches
Sportspeople from Belgrade
Serbian expatriate sportspeople in Italy
Serbian expatriate sportspeople in Romania
Serbian expatriate sportspeople in Russia
Serbian expatriate sportspeople in Switzerland